The Croatian Social Liberal Party ( or HSLS) is a conservative-liberal political party in Croatia. The HSLS was formed in 1989 as the first Croatian political party formed after the reintroduction of multi-party system.

HSLS first won the elections in 2000 and formed a coalition government with four other parties, including the largest party of the Croatian centre-left, the Social Democratic Party of Croatia. After losing the 2003 general election, the party's decline in political influence started. In the most recent 2015 general election, HSLS won 2 out of 151 seats in the Croatian Parliament as a member of a center-right coalition led by the Croatian Democratic Union party.

The HSLS is a member of the Liberal International and the Alliance of Liberals and Democrats for Europe Party. Party president is Darinko Kosor, elected to that post in November 2009.

Chronology 
The HSLS was formed on 20 May 1989 as Croatian Social Liberal Union. It was the first Croatian political party formed after the reintroduction of multi-party system. As such it was part of Coalition of People's Accord during the first free elections in 1990. Its first leader was Slavko Goldstein, succeeded in 1990 by Dražen Budiša, who remained the leader until 1995. HSLS became the main opposition party after 1992 presidential and parliamentary elections and remained such until the late 1990s.

In February 1996, Vlado Gotovac became the president of the party. However, in November 1997 Budiša became the president again, and a faction led by Gotovac split off to form the Liberal Party.

In 1998 HSLS created permanent coalition with Social Democratic Party (SDP), which won elections two years later, replaced ruling Croatian Democratic Union and formed the new government together with four other parties.

However, after the party split in 2002 (the forming of LIBRA), HSLS left the government.

At the 2003 Croatian parliamentary election, an alliance of the HSLS and the Democratic Centre won 4.0% of the popular vote and 3 out of 151 seats. Two of these seats were held by the HSLS, down from 25 in 2000, causing Budiša to submit his resignation as president. After elections the HSLS supported the government of Ivo Sanader. In 2004, Ivan Čehok was elected party president.

After the 2005 Croatian local elections it was announced that there are merger negotiations between HSLS and the Liberal Party. The latter dissolved itself, with membership and party infrastructure re-joining HSLS in January 2006. Đurđa Adlešić succeeded Ivan Čehok as the leader of reunited party.

Before the 2007 elections, HSLS, although still in government announced joint election ticket with opposition parties – Croatian Peasant Party and Alliance of Primorje-Gorski Kotar. This coalition as a whole lost five seats compared to the previous election, but HSLS retained their two seats. They remained in the governing coalition under Ivo Sanader.

HSLS continued to support the government of Jadranka Kosor until July 10, 2010 when Darinko Kosor, the leader of the Croatian Social Liberal Party, announced his party's decision to leave the governing coalition. This resulted in the party's two parliamentary representatives Ivan Čehok and Antun Korušec leaving the party. Since 14. July 2010, HSLS have no representatives in Parliament for the first time in party's history.

Ideology 
In recent years by supporting Ivo Sanader, HSLS moved from social liberalism to conservative liberalism. This was considered unpopular, and the party's decline in political influence resumed.

Ahead of 2013 constitutional referendum for defining marriage as being a union between a man and a woman, HSLS urged its members and supporters to vote against proposed change.

Election results

Legislative
The following is a summary of the party's results in legislative elections for the Croatian Parliament. The "Total votes" and "Percentage" columns include sums of votes won by pre-election coalitions HSLS had been part of. In elections where it became possible for the candidates of HSLS to receive preferential votes, that statistic is added to the total votes column. The "Total seats" column includes sums of seats won by HSLS in election constituencies plus representatives of ethnic minorities affiliated with HSLS.

Presidential
The following is a list of presidential candidates who were endorsed by HSLS in elections for President of Croatia.

See also 

 Liberalism in Croatia

References

External links 
  

Liberal parties in Croatia
Political parties established in 1989
Alliance of Liberals and Democrats for Europe Party member parties
Conservative liberal parties
1989 establishments in Croatia
Organizations based in Zagreb
Centrist parties in Croatia